Andreas Cratander (born Andreas Hartmann in Strasbourg, ca. 1490; died 1540) was a Swiss printer, publisher, and book seller. Based in Basel, his workshop is estimated to have published at least 150 individual works between 1518 and 1535, predominantly Latin and Greek classics in their original languages.

He studied at the Heidelberg University from where he graduated with a baccalaureates. After he learned the ropes in the workshop of the printer Matthias Schürcher in Strasbourg. From 1515 he worked for Adam Petri in Basel.  In 1518, he opened his own print and from 1522 employed the later reformator of Basel Johannes Oecolampad. Oecolampadius would also lodge in his house. He published a reprint of the commentaries to the Evangeliums of Jaque Lefèrvre d'Étaples in 1523 which cover was adorned with a metalcut of Hans Holbein the Younger, signed by Jacob Faber. d'Étaples was such impressed, he gave Cratander his commentaries to the letters of the New Testament to print.

References

1540 deaths
Swiss printers
Businesspeople from Basel-Stadt
1490 births